The 1931 Spanish general election for the Constituent Cortes was the first such election held in the Second Republic. It took place in several rounds.

Background

General Primo de Rivera, who had run a military dictatorship in Spain since 1923, resigned as head of government in January 1930. There was little support for a return to the pre-1923 system, and the monarchy had lost credibility by backing the military government. Dámaso Berenguer was ordered by the king to form a replacement government, but his dictablanda dictatorship failed to provide a viable alternative. In the municipal elections of 12 April 1931, little support was shown for pro-monarchy parties in the major cities. King Alfonso XIII fled the country and the Second Spanish Republic was formed.

The Second Republic was a source of hope to the poorest in Spanish society and a threat to the richest, but had broad support from all segments of society. Niceto Alcalá-Zamora was the first prime minister of the Republic. The wealthier landowners and the middle class accepted the Republic because of the lack of any suitable alternative.

Electoral system
An electoral law of May 1931 replaced the previous single-member constituencies with much larger multi-member ones. The Senate was abolished and so the government became unicameral. There would be one seat for every 50,000 people, with a separate seat for any city with more than 100,000 inhabitants. Any electoral list gaining an outright majority of votes in a district would be guaranteed and simultaneously restricted to 80% of the seats. A list winning a plurality of votes but failing to win a majority would receive two thirds of the seats. The remainder would be passed to the second list if it received 20% of the vote. Voters were entitled to vote for as many or as few districts as they liked. The system favoured multi-party coalitions, which could thus win a majority of votes.

Women were unable to vote in this election, but they could stand for and be elected to office. They achieved the vote in the Constitution of December 1931 and were able to vote for the first time in 1933, before those in France and some other countries.

Campaign
The Liberal Republican Right (DLR) was led by Alcalá Zamora and Miguel Maura. Uniquely, it identified as Catholic and did the most to appeal to monarchists and those on the right. However, despite putting up 116 candidates across Spain, it led a poor campaign, which was poorly organised.

Led by Alejandro Lerroux, the Radical Republican Party occupied most of the middle ground and was far more successful at winning conservative, moderate support. Such conservatism was at odds with most republicans, who believed greater reforms were necessary to bring about stability. That was the case with the Radical Socialist Party, led by Álvaro de Albornoz and Marcelino Domingo, which promulgated extremist views. "There is nothing to be conserved", Albornoz argued.

Manuel Azaña Díaz lead the Republican Action Party. Azaña was keen to change the political system quickly – he hated the moderation and compromise being argued by Lerroux.

The Spanish Socialist Workers' Party stood to the left of the political spectrum, and was kept in line with the coalition by a majority of its leadership, rather than unanimously. A legal revolution was necessary, argued a key figure, Largo Caballero. However, extremists inside and outside of the party loomed as potential competition, and the party's line was thus that the coalition was only a stepping stone to a fully-socialist state.

The official instructions were that civil authorities were not to interfere with the vote; but in some areas ad hoc republican patrols were set up, which undoubtedly deterred some conservatives from voting. Some members of councils stood; some provincial governors did the same, but not it their own area of governance. The Republican-Socialist coalition dominated the campaigning; the right, still reeling at the loss of the monarchy, remained disorganised. Only in one area did the right manage to collectivise sufficiently: the Basque Country. Many members of the right switched to republicans, despite having little in common with them: one group in Asturias went under the contradictory name the "Monarchist-Republican Party".

Results
The Republic and Socialist coalition won a huge victory and was helped by a public that was more liberally inclined than in 1933 or 1936. The lowest turnout, 56%, was in Ceuta; the highest, 88%, in Palencia. Broadly speaking, turnout was higher in the north than in the south. Overall, turnout was around 70% which was considered high. The Socialists won around 2,000,000 votes; Republicans 1,700,000, Radical Socialists 1,350,000 and the Liberal Republican Right 950,000.

Votes
Summary of the 28 June 1931 election results:

Seats

Party divisions at the start of the Cortes, after seats had been awarded between coalitions:

References

Notes

Citations

Sources

General
1931 in Spain
1931
June 1931 events